The following list of mines in Serbia is subsidiary to the list of mines article and lists working, defunct and future mines in Serbia and is organised by the primary mineral output(s) and province. For a history of mining in the region now known as Serbia, see Vujic 2014.

For practical purposes stone, marble and other quarries may be included in this list. Operational mines are demarcated by bold typeface, future mines are demarcated in italics.

Coal mines  
 Aleksinački Rudnik (closed)
 Bogovina
 Kostolac coal mine
 RB Kolubara
 Senjski Rudnik

Cobalt mines  
 Ruđinci mine
 Veluće mine

Copper mines  
 Bor mine
 Borska Reka mine
 Cerovo mine
 Dumitru Potok mine
 Kiseljak mine
 Majdanpek mine
 Mali Krivelj mine
 Veliki Krivelj mine

Graphite mines  
 Donja Ljubata mine

Lithium mines  
 Jadar mine

Magnesium mines  
 Bela Stena mine

Molybdenum mines  
 Mačkatica mine
 Surdulica mine

Nickel mines  
 Mokra Gora mine

Unspecified
Rudna Glava, former mine, now archaeological site

References 

Serbia